XHESW-FM is a Mexican radio station in Ciudad Madera, Chihuahua. Known as Radio Madera, XHESW is owned by GRD Multimedia and carries a full service radio format. It is the only radio station in Ciudad Madera.

History
XHESW began as daytimer XESW-AM 1300; this station received its concession in December 1963. On 1300, the station broadcast with one kilowatt of power. In 2008, the station moved to 970 and increased its power to five kilowatts.

In 2010, XESW received permission to move to FM, where it broadcasts 24 hours a day as XHESW-FM 96.1.

References

Radio stations in Chihuahua
Radio stations in Mexico with continuity obligations